Gilson Run is a  long tributary to Pine Creek in Warren County and Forest Counties, Pennsylvania.

Course
Gilson Run rises about 0.5 miles northeast of Pineville, Pennsylvania in Forest County and then flows northwest into Warren County to Pine Creek about 3 miles southwest of McGraw Corners, Pennsylvania.

Watershed
Gilson Run drains  of area, receives about 44.9 in/year of precipitation, and has a wetness index of 439.04 and is about 93% forested.

References

Additional Maps

Rivers of Pennsylvania
Rivers of Forest County, Pennsylvania
Rivers of Warren County, Pennsylvania